Thomas John Hawkins (born 21 July 1988) is an Australian rules footballer playing for the Geelong Football Club in the Australian Football League (AFL). At 198 cm (6 ft 6 in) tall and weighing , Hawkins has the ability to play as either a full-forward or centre half-forward. He grew up in New South Wales before moving to  Victoria to attend Melbourne Grammar School, where his football abilities earned him a spot in the first XVIII in year ten. He played top-level football with the Sandringham Dragons in the TAC Cup and Vic Metro in the AFL Under-18 Championships. His accolades as a junior include national and state representation, the Larke Medal as the AFL Under-18 Championships most valuable player, and All-Australian selection. 

As the eldest son of former Geelong champion Jack Hawkins, Hawkins was drafted by Geelong under the father–son draft rule with the forty-first selection in the 2006 national draft. He made his AFL debut in 2007, which saw former  coach, Denis Pagan compare him to the highest goal scorer in the history of the league and former full-forward, Tony Lockett, after his debut game. His debut season saw him earn an AFL Rising Star nomination and he was part of Geelong's Victorian Football League (VFL) premiership side. He has since become a three-time AFL premiership player, a Coleman Medalist, an All-Australian full forward, a Carji Greeves Medallist as the club best and fairest player, an eleven-time leading goalkicker for Geelong, and a recipient of the former AFL Army Award—awarded to a player who produces significant acts of bravery or selflessness during a season.

Early life
Hawkins was born in Finley, New South Wales to Jack and Jenny Hawkins. He grew up in the New South Wales region of Finley as the second child among four children. He attended Finley High School and played for the Finley Football Club before making the move south of the border to begin boarding at Melbourne Grammar School. Hawkins' footballing ability was recognised early on when he was selected to play first XVIII football for the school while still in year ten, when many of his teammates were completing their final year of schooling at year twelve. Hawkins kicked four goals on debut for the school and his performances up forward soon received attention from AFL recruiting teams. By the time he had reached his final school year he was rewarded with joint captaincy of the football team alongside Hawthorn draftee Xavier Ellis. He was also selected in the Associated Public Schools (APS) team to play the Associated Grammar School (AGS) selected football team in the traditional annual clash of schools, where he won best on ground honours for his performance.

Having gained permission to join local under-18 club in 2006, the Sandringham Dragons for numerous games during the season, Hawkins impressed in his limited appearances within the elite TAC Cup competition, highlighted by a twenty-two disposal, nine mark, and five goal effort in just his third game. In the same year, he was awarded an AIS/AFL academy scholarship as part of the ninth intake. The scholarship, awarded to outstanding young athletes entering the last year of their junior football development, saw Hawkins participate in several training camps, capped off with representation for Australia in the under-18 International Rules Series, before completing his summer training with the Geelong Football Club.

In the mid-year of 2006, Hawkins was selected to play in the 2006 AFL Under-18 Championships, lining up at full forward for Vic Metro. A best on ground performance which yielded twelve marks and six goals in the opening match against South Australia began a wave of unprecedented hype and attention, with Hawkins drawing comparisons to former  forward, Jonathan Brown and leading Vic Metro coach David Dickson to declare the young forward as "the best footballer I've seen...since Chris Judd". Hawkins was awarded the Larke Medal as the most valuable player within division one and named as the tournament's All-Australian full-forward, just falling short of the all-time contested marking record held by Justin Koschitzke.

AFL career

2007–2011: early career
Hawkins was officially selected by Geelong in the 2006 national draft under the father–son rule. While many pundits lauded him as the best key position prospect within the draft, and felt Hawkins' junior performances warranted possible selection with the top overall pick, the father-son rules at the time only required Geelong to use a middle-tier third round pick to draft him. The subsequent controversy over what was widely acknowledged as a bargain gain for the Cats led to the AFL amending the father-son ruling for future use. With a reputation as one of the finest young tall forwards in the land, Hawkins was immediately billed as the successor to the legendary Gary Ablett, whose retirement ten years earlier had left a gaping hole in Geelong's forward line. A stress reaction injury to his right leg, however, halted Hawkins' pre-season, forcing his much-awaited debut in Geelong colours to take place in the Victorian Football League (VFL) side.

Hawkins made his highly anticipated debut for the Geelong seniors in round two of the 2007 season against . Opposed to Carlton captain Lance Whitnall, Hawkins impressed with three goals and several strong marks in Geelong's seventy-eight point victory, prompting then-Carlton coach, Denis Pagan to label him the next Tony Lockett. Other revered media figures, such as Gerard Healy and David Parkin, were moved enough to describe the debut as the best first-up performance in recent memory. Uncommonly for AFL debutants, he followed up with an even more impressive performance in his second game, kicking four first-half goals to help set up a victory against  at the Melbourne Cricket Ground (MCG), earning the AFL Rising Star nomination for round three in the process. Question marks, however, were raised over his fitness and ability to run out entire games, and after nine games in his debut season, which saw him kick twelve goals, Hawkins saw out the rest of the year with the clubs' VFL side. There, Hawkins helped Geelong reach the VFL Grand Final for the second successive year, booting three goals as the Cats defeated the Coburg Tigers to claim their first VFL premiership since 2002.

Despite inconsistencies in Hawkin's form, he played twenty-four matches for the 2009 season, including the grand final, where he played alongside other father-son selections, Gary Ablett, Matthew Scarlett and Mark Blake. He scored two goals in the game to help Geelong defeat  by twelve points, winning the 2009 AFL premiership. One of his goals was notably controversial, as it was later ruled it had hit the goal post, which should have been registered as a behind; this was one of the reasons behind the introduction of the goal review system implemented by the AFL during the 2012 season.

A mid-year footy injury saw Hawkins miss seven weeks of football in 2010, and he finished the season with eighteen matches and twenty-one goals. He did, however, play in Geelong's final series; a narrow loss to St Kilda in the qualifying final hampered Geelong's chances of retaining the premiership and a forty-one point loss to eventual premiers, in the preliminary final ended Geelong and Hawkins' season.

Hawkins faced scrutiny during the 2011 season for his inconsistent form, which saw him dropped from the senior side in the middle of the season. He was highly praised during Geelong's finals series in which Herald Sun journalist, Scott Gullan labelled the qualifying win against  the best match of Hawkins' career at the time. He bettered that performance two weeks later in the 2011 AFL Grand Final, where he finished the day with nineteen disposals, nine marks and three goals to win his second premiership medallion. An injury to fellow forward, James Podsiadly in the second quarter meant Hawkins was the main target in the forward line where he kicked three goals in the third quarter and he was labelled as the unlikely hero by Fox Sports Australia journalist Mike Hedge. His performance saw him awarded five votes for the Norm Smith Medal, coming third behind Jimmy Bartel with thirteen votes and Joel Selwood with nine votes. It was later revealed in a book—Greatness, Inside Geelong's Path to Premiership History—that he was nearly dropped for the final series for retiring forward Cameron Mooney.

2012–present: Geelong leading goalkicker
In 2012, Hawkins had a breakout year, kicking sixty-two goals to finish equal second in the Coleman Medal. In the round 19 match against Hawthorn, he kicked six goals, including a goal after the siren, to deliver Geelong a two-point victory. The win was Geelong's ninth consecutive victory over the Hawks since losing to them in the 2008 AFL Grand Final. His emergence was rewarded with selection in the 2012 All-Australian team, the Carji Greeves Medal as the club best and fairest player and he was Geelong's leading goalkicker.

After Hawkins' emergence in 2012, a bulging disc in his back impacted his abilities during the 2013 season; struggling with form throughout the season, he received bronx cheers from Geelong supporters in the round 20 match against  at Simonds Stadium after he managed only six disposals and a goal. The persistent back injury forced him to miss the start of the finals series by missing the qualifying final match against Fremantle at Simonds Stadium. He played in the next two finals matches, including the five point loss against Hawthorn in the preliminary final which ended Geelong's season. Despite the back injury, he managed to play twenty-two matches for the season kicking forty-nine goals and he was Geelong's leading goalkicker for the second consecutive year.

Described as returning to being a "genuine match winner" during the 2014 season by teammate Tom Lonergan, Hawkins overcame his back injury to replicate his form from the 2012 season. During the qualifying final match against , he was scrutinised for a jumper punch against Ben Stratton, which was pondered whether Hawkins would face a suspension; he was ultimately cleared of the incident, which allowed him to play in the semi-final loss against North Melbourne. His season was rewarded with selection in the initial forty man All-Australian squad, although he missed out on the final team. In addition, he finished second in the best and fairest count behind Joel Selwood, he finished second in the Coleman Medal and he was Geelong's leading goalkicker for the third consecutive season.

Personal tragedy hit Hawkins early in the 2015 season when his mother, Jenny, died in April. He subsequently missed the round three match against  before returning the next week against North Melbourne in which he paid tribute to his mother after his only goal in the match; in addition, the game saw him reach his 150th AFL match milestone. He missed only one match for the remainder of the season, the round seven match against . Since joining Geelong, it was the first season the club missed the finals series, and he ultimately played nineteen games for the season and kicked forty-six goals, making him Geelong's leading goalkicker for the fourth consecutive season. Entering the season, he remained unsigned, meaning he would become a free agent if he remained out of contract at the end of the season. He ultimately ignored the lure of free agency, and he signed a five-year contract in July, tying him to the club until the end of the 2020 season.

The first half of the 2016 season saw Hawkins play inconsistently due to his form wavering, with Geelong coach, Chris Scott noting Hawkins' "impact isn't what he'd like it to be and hasn't been for some time"; despite his inconsistency, Scott reassured fans that he believed Hawkins' best was still ahead of him. It was revealed at the end of the season, that he had played with a small tear in his meniscus, which resulted in post-season surgery. He missed one match for the season after he was suspended for striking  captain, Phil Davis, in round 11. The decision by the match review panel was criticised by the Herald Sun chief of football writer, Mark Robinson, where he labelled the decision "a joke", and the backlash forced match review panel member Nathan Burke to publicly defend the decision. Geelong returned to the final series in 2016, making it to the preliminary final and losing to Sydney by thirty-seven points at the MCG. He finished with twenty-three matches for the season, kicking fifty-five goals, and he was Geelong's leading goalkicker for the fifth consecutive season.

Statistics
Updated to the end of the 2022 season.

|-
| 2007 ||  || 26
| 9 || 12 || 10 || 52 || 25 || 77 || 33 || 9 || 1.3 || 1.1 || 5.8 || 2.8 || 8.6 || 3.7 || 1.0 || 0
|-
| 2008 ||  || 26
| 10 || 13 || 5 || 71 || 48 || 119 || 51 || 15 || 1.3 || 0.5 || 7.1 || 4.8 || 11.9 || 5.1 || 1.5 || 2
|-
| scope=row bgcolor=F0E68C | 2009# ||  || 26
| 24 || 34 || 17 || 148 || 130 || 278 || 131 || 56 || 1.4 || 0.7 || 6.2 || 5.4 || 11.6 || 5.5 || 2.3 || 0
|-
| 2010 ||  || 26
| 18 || 21 || 13 || 95 || 131 || 226 || 102 || 47 || 1.2 || 0.7 || 5.3 || 7.3 || 12.6 || 5.7 || 2.6 || 0
|-
| scope=row bgcolor=F0E68C | 2011# ||  || 26
| 18 || 27 || 17 || 125 || 98 || 223 || 88 || 38 || 1.5 || 0.9 || 6.9 || 5.4 || 12.4 || 4.9 || 2.1 || 0
|-
| 2012 ||  || 26
| 22 || 62 || 38 || 198 || 80 || 278 || 144 || 25 || 2.8 || 1.7 || 9.0 || 3.6 || 12.6 || 6.5 || 1.1 || 10
|-
| 2013 ||  || 26
| 23 || 49 || 20 || 141 || 74 || 215 || 93 || 22 || 2.2 || 0.4 || 6.4 || 3.4 || 9.8 || 4.2 || 1.0 || 0
|-
| 2014 ||  || 26
| 24 || 68 || 40 || 222 || 75 || 297 || 161 || 32 || 2.8 || 1.7 || 9.3 || 3.1 || 12.4 || 6.7 || 1.3 || 7
|-
| 2015 ||  || 26
| 19 || 46 || 20 || 145 || 51 || 196 || 93 || 31 || 2.4 || 1.1 || 7.6 || 2.7 || 10.3 || 4.9 || 1.6 || 3
|-
| 2016 ||  || 26
| 23 || 55 || 31 || 198 || 90 || 288 || 126 || 39 || 2.4 || 1.3 || 8.6 || 3.9 || 12.5 || 5.5 || 1.7 || 2
|-
| 2017 ||  || 26
| 22 || 51 || 26 || 199 || 100 || 299 || 116 || 61 || 2.3 || 1.2 || 9.0 || 4.5 || 13.6 || 5.3 || 2.8 || 3
|-
| 2018 ||  || 26
| 21 || 60 || 29 || 212 || 113 || 325 || 153 || 40 || 2.9 || 1.4 || 10.1 || 5.4 || 15.5 || 7.3 || 1.9 || 9
|-
| 2019 ||  || 26
| 24 || 56 || 32 || 203 || 106 || 309 || 126 || 37 || 2.3 || 1.3 || 8.5 || 4.4 || 12.9 || 5.3 || 1.5 || 5
|-
| 2020 ||  || 26
| 21 || style="background:#CAE1FF; width:1em" | 49† || style="background:#CAE1FF; width:1em" | 36† || 172 || 87 || 259 || 114 || 40 || style="background:#CAE1FF; width:1em" | 2.3† || style="background:#CAE1FF; width:1em" | 1.7† || 8.2 || 4.1 || 12.3 || 5.4 || 1.9 || 11
|-
| 2021 ||  || 26
| 25 || style="background:#CAE1FF; width:1em" | 62†|| 37 || 215 || 127 || 342 || 129 || 50 || 2.5 || 1.5 || 8.6 || 5.1 || 13.7 || 5.2 || 2.0 || 6
|-
| scope=row bgcolor=F0E68C | 2022# ||  || 26
| 25 || style="background:#CAE1FF; width:1em" | 67†|| bgcolor=CAE1FF | 43† || 221 || 107 || 328 || 142 || 39 || 2.7 || 1.7 || 8.8 || 4.3 || 13.1 || 5.7 || 1.6 || 8
|- class=sortbottom
! colspan=3 | Career
! 327 !! 732 !! 414 !! 2617 !! 1442 !! 4059 !! 1802 !! 615 !! 2.2 !! 1.3 !! 8.0 !! 4.4 !! 12.4 !! 5.5 !! 1.9 !! 66
|}

Notes

Honours and achievements
Team
 3× AFL premiership player: 2009, 2011, 2022
 4× McClelland Trophy: 2007, 2008, 2019, 2022

Individual
 5× All-Australian team: 2012, 2019, 2020, 2021, 2022(C)
 Coleman Medal: 2020
 11× Geelong leading goalkicker: 2012, 2013, 2014, 2015, 2016, 2017, 2018, 2019, 2020, 2021, 2022
 AFLPA best first year player: 2012
 AFLCA best young player of the year: 2013
 2× 22under22 team: 2013, 2015
 Geelong F.C. Community Champion Award: 2019
 Geelong F.C. Tom Harley Award for Best Clubman: 2021
 AFL Rising Star nominee: 2007

Personal life
As well as his father, Hawkins' uncles Michael Hawkins and Robb Hawkins—and his maternal grandfather, Fred Le Deux—all played football for Geelong.

Hawkins' nickname 'Tomahawk' is a play on his first name and surname, with references to a tomahawk axe or tomahawk missile, and has proven a popular calling card within the league.

References

External links

1988 births
People educated at Melbourne Grammar School
Living people
Sandringham Dragons players
Geelong Football Club players
Geelong Football Club Premiership players
Australian rules footballers from New South Wales
All-Australians (AFL)
Carji Greeves Medal winners
Coleman Medal winners
Three-time VFL/AFL Premiership players